Job Nixon (1891–1938) was an English painter and engraver.

He was born in 1891  in The Potteries, in Staffordshire.

When he was eighteen, he won a scholarship to the Royal College of Art. He later studied at the Slade School of Fine Art, and then another scholarship enabled him to attend the British School of Engraving in Rome.

He as known for his etchings and drypoints, producing over 75. Many of these depicted places in France or Italy.

He became an associate of the Royal Watercolour Society in 1928 and a member in 1934.

His paintings are in a number of public collections, including those of Manchester Art Gallery, the Potteries Museum & Art Gallery the Royal Watercolour Society, the Art Institute of Chicago, the Nelson-Atkins Museum of Art, the Auckland Art Gallery, and the National Gallery of Victoria.

He died in 1938.

In a review of a 1972 exhibition by fellow Staffordshire-born engraver Geoffrey Heath Wedgwood, Edward Morris wrote:

References 

1891 births
1938 deaths
People from Stoke-on-Trent (district)
20th-century English painters
Alumni of the Royal College of Art
Alumni of the Slade School of Fine Art